General elections were held in Uruguay on 25 November 1962, alongside a constitutional referendum. The result was a victory for the National Party, which won the most seats in the National Council of Government, the Chamber of Deputies and the Senate.

Results

References

External links

Elections in Uruguay
Uruguay
General
Uruguay
Election and referendum articles with incomplete results